Sergey Viktorovich Alimpiev (September 22, 1958, Rasskazovo, Tambov Oblast —  December 18, 2005, Moscow) was a Soviet and Russian operetta artist, soloist of   in 1984, Honored Artist of Russia (1998).

Biography
He graduated from the Russian State Institute of Performing Arts with a degree in  Actor of Musical Theater.

In 1990, together with the speaker of the Soviet Central Television  Marina Burtseva was the host of the Yalta's Vocal Competition.

He executed the leading roles in Kalman's operetta operas,  The Grand Duchess of Gerolstein  by Offenbach,  The Grooms  by Isaac Dunaevsky, Strauss's  Die Fledermaus, Lehar's  Merry Widow.    Sergey Alimpiev's heroes  are always more restrained than frank. But hands and give out this tender, vulnerable, thin soul.

He was sick with AIDS. The disease struck the singer literally in a year, and he had to be hospitalized. He died in December 2005 from hepatitis.

References

External links
 Сцена и дуэт Китти и Джека (Сизова, Алимпиев, 1991)

1958 births
People from Rasskazovo
2005 deaths
Soviet male stage actors
20th-century Russian male actors
21st-century Russian male actors
20th-century Russian singers
21st-century Russian singers
Russian male stage actors
Soviet male singers
Honored Artists of the Russian Federation
Baritones
AIDS-related deaths in Russia
Deaths from hepatitis
Russian State Institute of Performing Arts alumni
20th-century Russian male singers
21st-century Russian male singers